This is a list of seasons played by Wrexham Association Football Club from the 1877–78 season, when the club began playing in competitive fixtures following the founding of the Welsh Cup, to the most recent current season.

The club was formed in 1864 by members of the Wrexham Cricket Club, who wanted a sporting activity for the winter months, which makes them (after Sheffield, Cray, Hallam, Notts County, and Stoke City) the sixth oldest football team, third oldest professional club and the oldest in Wales. Their first game was played on 22 October 1864 at the Denbigh County Cricket Ground (The Racecourse) against the Prince of Wales Fire Brigade.

In 1878, they won the inaugural Welsh Cup, beating Druids 1–0, and the club went on to win the competition a further 23 times, still the most wins by any team, until they were barred entry during the 1990s, along with other Welsh clubs playing in the English football league system. Through winning the Welsh Cup, Wrexham also qualified several times for the UEFA Cup Winners' Cup, reaching the quarter-finals during the 1975–76 campaign.

In 1890, the club were founding members of the second incarnation of The Combination. Apart from a brief two-year spell in the Welsh Senior League between 1894 and 1896, Wrexham spent the following fifteen seasons in The Combination, winning the competition on four occasions, before moving into the Birmingham & District League in 1905. Two years after the end of the First World War, Wrexham joined The Football League, where they spent eighty consecutive seasons, before being relegated to the Conference National in 2008.

Wrexham's highest position in the Football League was 15th in the old Second Division (now Football League Championship) in 1978–79. Their lowest position in the League was 24th in the Football League Fourth Division in 1965–66 (at a time where League membership maintenance was by election) and in 1990–91 (when the League decided to suspend relegation due to expansion of the First Division to 22 clubs). The feat was repeated for a third time in Football League Two in 2007–08 and this time they were relegated to Conference National. Their lowest position in the Conference, and thus overall, was 19th in the 2019–20 season.

Seasons

Key

Key to league record:
 P = Played
 W = Games won
 D = Games drawn
 L = Games lost
 F = Goals for
 A = Goals against
 Pts = Points
 Pos = Final position

Key to divisions:
 Division 1 = Football League First Division
 Division 2 = Football League Second Division
 Division 3 = Football League Third Division
 Division Three North = Football League Third Division North
 Division 4 = Football League Fourth Division
 League One = Football League One
 League Two = Football League Two

Key to rounds:
 QR = Qualifying round
 R1 = Round 1
 R2 = Round 2
 R3 = Round 3
 R4 = Round 4
 R5 = Round 5
 QF = Quarter-finals
 SF = Semi-finals
 RU = Runners-up
 W = Winners

Notes

References
 
 
 

Seasons
 
Wrexham
Wrexham